Upland is an unincorporated community in Mason County, West Virginia, United States.

References

Unincorporated communities in Mason County, West Virginia
Unincorporated communities in West Virginia